Henning Skilag is a Norwegian skiing club from Henning near Steinkjer.

Members include cross-country skiers Kari Vikhagen Gjeitnes, Karianne Bjellånes, Marte Elden, Tor Arne Brevik, and Morten Eilifsen.

Local rival teams are Steinkjer SK and Skogn IL.

References
Official site 

Sports teams in Norway

Sport in Trøndelag
Steinkjer